Borough 1 is the central borough of Düsseldorf, the state capital of North Rhine-Westphalia, Germany and the city's commercial and cultural center. The borough covers an area of 11.31 square kilometres and (as of December 2020) has about 86,000 inhabitants.

Despite being one of Düsseldorf's smallest boroughs by area, Stadtbezirk 1 includes several distinct quarters: the city's Medieval Altstadt is known as an entertainment district with plenty of Altbier pubs and bars, while the adjacent Baroque-style Carlstadt has a very Bohemian character. Stadtmitte is the city's shopping and central business district, extending into the three Gründerzeit quarters of Pempelfort, Derendorf and Golzheim - the latter three also being popular as both business locations and residential areas. The entire borough has a high density of institutions and enterprises associated with the arts and culture in general.

The borough shares borders (clockwise from north) with Düsseldorf boroughs 5, 6, 2, 3 and - over the Rhine - Borough 4.

Subdivisions 
Borough 1 is made up of six Stadtteile (city parts):

Places of interest

Landmarks 
 Düsseldorf Stock Exchange
 Königsallee
 Kunstakademie
 Marktplatz
 Schlossturm
 
 New Synagogue
 Drei-Scheiben-Haus
 Johannes-Church

Arts, Culture and Entertainment 
 Deutsche Oper am Rhein
 Düsseldorfer Schauspielhaus
 Filmmuseum
 Forum NRW
 Hetjens Museum (German museum of ceramics)
 Institut Français Düsseldorf
 Kom(m)ödchen (Political cabaret)
 Kunstsammlung Nordrhein-Westfalen - K20 (Grabbeplatz) and K21 (Ständehaus)
 Kunsthalle Düsseldorf
 Marionettentheater
 Museum Kunst Palast
 Stadtmuseum
 Tanzhaus NRW (theatre for dance)
 Tonhalle Düsseldorf (concert hall for classical music, jazz, pop, cabaret)

Shopping 
 Kö Gallerie
 Schadow-Arkaden
 Sevens Königsallee

Parks and open spaces 
 Hofgarten
 Königsallee
 Rheinpark
 Rheinuferpromenade

Transportation 
As the business center of Düsseldorf, Borough 1 is well served by numerous railway stations and highway. Largest train station is Düsseldorf Hauptbahnhof, other stations include Düsseldorf Wehrhahn and a dense net of both Düsseldorf Stadtbahn underground- and Rheinbahn tram-stations. The Rheinufertunnel is part of Bundesstraße 1 and runs some 2 km along the right Rhine side, diverting car traffic away from the streets. Two large bridges cross the river into the left-Rhenish quarter of Oberkassel.

Rhine bridges 
  Theodor-Heuss-Brücke
 Oberkasseler Brücke

Economy

All Nippon Airways has its Düsseldorf Sales Office in Stadtmitte, Borough 1.

See also 

 Boroughs of Düsseldorf

References

External links 
 Official webpage of the borough 

!